The Liwasang Bonifacio (Bonifacio Square), also known by its former name, Plaza Lawton, is a city square and transport hub in front of the Manila Central Post Office in the Ermita district of Manila, Philippines. It lies at the south end of Jones Bridge, MacArthur Bridge, and Quezon Bridge that link the northern districts of Binondo, Santa Cruz, and Quiapo to the central district of Ermita. The plaza straddles the dividing line between Ermita and Intramuros and is the starting point of Padre Burgos Avenue which connects to Taft Avenue and Roxas Boulevard in Rizal Park. 

Historically known as the Plaza del Fortín, the plaza was given its current name in 1963 after the revolutionary leader Andres Bonifacio who founded the independence movement of Katipunan during the Spanish colonial rule. A monument in his honour now stands in the center of the plaza. The plaza is a popular site of protests and demonstrations organized by several leftist groups, being one of four freedom parks in the City of Manila, where protests and rallies may be held without requiring permission from local authorities.

History

During the Spanish colonial times, the land that is now Liwasang Bonifacio and the Manila Central Post Office was the Cuartel del Fortín, a small fortress guarding the Pasig River east of Fort Santiago. It was located in the early Chinese trading village of Parián right outside the walls of Intramuros before it moved north of the Pasig River to Binondo and Santa Cruz in the late 18th century. El Fortín served as the quarters of a contingent of the Spanish infantry regiment where it is fronted by a small plaza surrounded by stone benches and trees. The Plaza del Fortín also doubled as a public recreation area at night where early residents would gather to hear musical performances. By the late 19th century, the fortress was acquired by the Compañía General de Tabacos de Filipinas and was converted into a factory called the Fabrica del Fortín. It was the largest tobacco factory in the Philippines at the time which employed more than 5,000 laborers. After the Spanish–American War, the factory became the head office of the Bureau of Post and was eventually replaced by the Manila Central Post Office building. The Manila tranvía had a terminal in the plaza which was then renamed Plaza Lawton after Henry Ware Lawton, the American general killed during the Philippine–American War. A statue of Andres Bonifacio was erected here in 1963 designed by national artist Guillermo Tolentino to commemorate his birth centennial. It was also in 1963 when Plaza Lawton was renamed Liwasang Bonifacio in his memory.

See also
 Andrés Bonifacio Monument

References

Plazas in Manila
Buildings and structures in Ermita
Cultural Properties of the Philippines in Metro Manila
National Historical Landmarks of the Philippines